Tubifera microsperma is a species of slime mold in the class Myxogastria.

References

External links

Myxogastria
Species described in 1873